Chris Williams (July 9, 1980 – March 15, 2017) was an American professional basketball player. He was a  small forward.

College career
Williams played college basketball at the University of Virginia, with the Virginia Cavaliers. He was named the ACC Rookie of the Year in 1999. He was also named Second Team All-ACC  in 2000, and Third Team All-ACC in 1999 and 2001. He had the nickname "Big Smooth".

Professional career
Williams led the 2004–05 EuroLeague in steals, with 2.8 per game, while playing with the Frankfurt Skyliners. He won the Germany BBL championship with Frankfurt, in 2004. From 2005 to 2007, he played in South Korea's KBL, with Ulsan Mobis Phoebus. He also played with Qingdao DoubleStar in China's CBA, and with Mahram Tehran in Iran's Basketball Super League.

Prior to playing in the EuroLeague, Williams played as an import for the Sydney Kings in Australia's NBL. With the Kings, he was a leading scorer, he shot at a high percentage, and he was a top rated rebounder, which were key components to the Kings winning their first ever NBL championship. He was awarded the MVP of the league, and the MVP of the league's final.

In a game between Qingdao and Dongguan Leopards, on December 25, 2009, Williams produced the second ever Quadruple-double in CBA history, as he finished the game with 15 points, 11 rebounds, 11 assists, and 11 steals. Qingdao won the game 122–103.

On October 10, 2013, Williams was named to the Sydney Kings' 25th Anniversary Team.

Personal
Williams died on March 15, 2017, due to blood clots in his heart.

References

External links 
Euroleague.net Profile
College statistics

1980 births
2017 deaths
African-American basketball players
American expatriate basketball people in Australia
American expatriate basketball people in China
American expatriate basketball people in Germany
American expatriate basketball people in Iran
American expatriate basketball people in South Korea
American expatriate basketball people in the Philippines
American expatriate basketball people in Turkey
American men's basketball players
Basketball players from Birmingham, Alabama
Foolad Mahan Isfahan BC players
Goyang Carrot Jumpers players
Korean Basketball League players
Mahram Tehran BC players
People from Adamsville, Alabama
Philippine Basketball Association imports
Qingdao Eagles players
San Miguel Beermen players
Skyliners Frankfurt players
Small forwards
Sydney Kings players
Türk Telekom B.K. players
Ulsan Hyundai Mobis Phoebus players
Virginia Cavaliers men's basketball players
20th-century African-American people
21st-century African-American sportspeople